John Baptist Gagnon (October 5, 1883 - May 4, 1939) was an American strongman performer. He was 5-foot-10-inches tall, weighed 230 pounds, and had 17-inch biceps. At one time, he claimed the unofficial title of "World's Strongest Man."

Biography

He was born on October 5, 1883, in Caribou, Maine. Deferring to the wishes of his family, Gagnon gave up performing in the late 1920s.  He took a job with the Vicory and Hill Company in Augusta, Maine, where his job was to handle large rolls of paper, each weighing between 500 and 1,000 pounds. Normally, two men were required for the job, but Gagnon did it alone and collected double pay.

Gagnon did not drink alcohol and abstained from coffee, tea and tobacco. He ate two meals a day and preferred to drink milk. In 1922, Gagnon lifted a heavy table upon which 20 men were standing ranging from 105 to 215 pounds. The weight totalled 4,040 pounds. Gagnon was considered the strongest man in the world in the 1930s.

He died on May 4, 1939, in Augusta, Maine.

World's Strongest Man contest
In a contest against Warren Lincoln Travis in 1923, Gagnon bested the champion.  A platform weighing 710 pounds was set up that could be lifted from above and also back lifted from below. Here are Gagnon's accomplishments with the platform:
Finger Lift – 794 pounds
One Hand Lift – 1,111 pounds
Two Hand Lift – 1,575 pounds
Two Hand and Knees Lift – 2,195 pounds
Neck Lift – 1,317 pounds
Harness Lift – 2,689 pounds
Teeth Lift – 627 pounds
One Arm Lift – 924 pounds
Two Arm Lift – 1,248 pounds
Back Lift – 4,170 pounds
Total – 16,650 pounds, total time taken 25 minutes

Physical abilities
Among the Gagnon's alleged physical abilities are the following:
 He could take deep breaths, expanding his large chest to the point where he would begin popping buttons off his shirt, sending them flying.
 He could take a horseshoe in his bare hands and twist it until it broke in half.
 He could bend a standard metal can-opener into a U-shape.
 He could bend a silver dollar coin between his thumb and fingers.
 He could pick up and carry an upright piano by himself.
 He could stand with his back against a wall and with his feet flat on the floor stretch his body to increase his height by 4 inches.

References

1883 births
1939 deaths
American male weightlifters
American strength athletes
People associated with physical culture
People from Caribou, Maine
Sportspeople from Augusta, Maine
Sportspeople from Maine
20th-century American people